Alexander Shpatov (born in 1985 in Sofia, Bulgaria) is a contemporary Bulgarian writer. He graduated from the American College of Sofia and the Sofia University Law School. His works have been translated into German and English.

Books 
Short story collections:
 Footnotes (2005), edited by Deyan Enev and published by Vesela Lyutzkanova Publishing House,  awarded as the best fiction debut in the 34th Yuzhna Prolet National Literary Competition in 2006;
 Footnote Stories (2008), edited by Georgi Gospodinov and published by Janet 45. Nominated for the 2008 Helikon Book of the Year Award. Translated into German as Fussnotengeschichten (Wieser Verlag, 2010)
 Calendar of Stories (2011), published by Enthusiast Publishing House.

References

External links 
 Alexander Shpatov's Profile at the Contemporary Bulgarian Writers Website
 Alexander Shpatov at LiterNet
 Alexander Shpatov at Literaturen Club

1985 births
Living people
Bulgarian writers